The Provisional Priamurye Government or Provisional Priamur Government existed in the region of Priamurye of the Russian Far East between May 27, 1921 and June 16, 1923. It was the last Russian State enclave during the Russian Civil War.

History

The government had its origin in a 1921 White Army coup in Vladivostok and its environs.  The coup aimed for the Priamurye region to break away from the Far Eastern Republic and to survive behind a cordon sanitaire of Japanese troops involved in the Siberian Intervention. The coup was started on May 23, 1921 by the  Kappelevtsy, the remnants of Vladimir Kappel's People's Army of Komuch.

Both had been deputies of the State Duma of the Russian Empire and supporters of the 1917 Russian Provisional Government. Somewhat later in 1921 the Cossack ataman Grigory Semyonov attempted to take power in the Priamurye, but he had no backing from the Japanese and eventually withdrew. The Kappelevtsy and the Semyonovtsy (Semyonov's supporters) despised each other.

Gradually the Priamurye enclave was expanded to Khabarovsk and then to Spassk, 125 miles north of Vladivostok. The Merkulovs were deposed in June 1922 by the Priamurye Zemsky Sobor and replaced by one of Admiral Alexander Kolchak's generals, Mikhail Diterikhs.

In July 1922, a Zemsky Sobor (Приамурский Земский Собор) was convened in the territory. This sobor called all Russian people to repent for the overthrow of the Tsar and proclaimed a new Tsar, Grand Duke Nikolai Nikolayevich.  Patriarch Tikhon was named as the honorary chairman of the sobor. Neither the Grand Duke nor the Patriarch was present. The territory was renamed Priamursky Zemsky Krai and Diterikhs styled himself  voyevoda. The army was renamed the Zemskaya Rat ("Territorial Rat'" - the archaic Slavic term rat'  means "military force"). 

When the Japanese withdrew from the Priamurye (June to October 1922), the Soviet army of the Far Eastern Republic retook most of the Priamurye Government territory. The Ayano-Maysky District was  controlled by Anatoly Pepelyayev at that time; its surrender in June 1923 marked the end of the Russian Civil War.

See also 
Far Eastern Federal District
Allied intervention in the Russian Civil War
American Expeditionary Force Siberia
William Sidney Graves
Sergei Prokofiev
Green Ukraine or Zeleny Klyn
Siberian Intervention
Yakut Revolt
Soviet Central Asia

Footnotes

References 
Yuri Korolkov, Sovershenno Sekretno, Pri Opasnosti Szhech, Minsk: Belarus Publishers, 1986 (memoirs of the doctor Aleksandr Mikulin).

External links 
Postal stamps of the PPG

Former countries in East Asia
White Russia
Provisional governments of the Russian Civil War
History of Northeast Asia
States and territories established in 1921
1922 disestablishments